Stumpf Field is a baseball-only stadium in Manheim Township, Pennsylvania that opened in 1938. It was built as the home of the Lancaster Red Roses baseball team, who played in the Interstate, Piedmont, and Eastern Leagues through 1961.  The ballpark is now used for intramural and high school baseball.  This field was donated to the Red Rose players by John G. Stumpf, owner of Stumpf Oil among other foundations and monuments throughout Lancaster County.

History 

Built in 1938, Stumpf Field is a simple ballpark with makeshift bleachers down each baseline. The ballpark at one time had covered bleachers behind homeplate, but they have been taken down.  The seating on both the first and third baselines is still in place, and retains most its original wooden frame.

The Lancaster Red Roses played at Stumpf Field from 1938 to 1961.  The team folded in 1961, and Stumpf Field has since been relegated as a local baseball and softball venue.  It was sold to Jeff Sweigart, owner of McMinn's Asphalt and a baseball enthusiast, in 2003 and renovated for local baseball leagues for players ages 20–40, as well as for 40 and older.
Stumpf Field served as home of the Millersville University Marauders baseball team prior to the 2007 season, until a new stadium was erected on campus.

See also
 Clipper Magazine Stadium

References

External links 
 Stumpf Field

Buildings and structures in Lancaster, Pennsylvania
Sports in Lancaster, Pennsylvania
Baseball venues in Pennsylvania
1938 establishments in Pennsylvania
Sports venues completed in 1938
College baseball venues in the United States
High school baseball venues in the United States